Alejandro Arias (born November 20, 1967) is an American former professional baseball infielder, who played Major League Baseball from 1992 to 2002.

In his career, Arias played for the Chicago Cubs, Florida Marlins (–), Philadelphia Phillies (–), San Diego Padres and New York Yankees.

He had the highest career batting average as a pinch hitter with over 150 at-bats, with a .320 average. His .265 career average and .338 on-base percentage are about average.

External links

1967 births
Living people
Major League Baseball infielders
Chicago Cubs players
Florida Marlins players
Philadelphia Phillies players
San Diego Padres players
New York Yankees players
People from New York City
Águilas Cibaeñas players
American expatriate baseball players in the Dominican Republic
Yuma Scorpions players
Charleston Wheelers players
Charlotte Knights players
Columbus Clippers players
Peoria Chiefs players
Rochester Red Wings players
Wytheville Cubs players
Baseball players from New York City